Gloucester 3 was an English rugby union league which sat at the eleventh level of league rugby union in England for teams based in Gloucestershire as well as some in Bristol. Promoted clubs moved into Gloucester 2, and since the cancellation of Gloucester 4 at the end of the 1995–96 season there had been no relegation.  The division was discontinued at the end of the 2017–18 season and Gloucester 2 was divided into north and south regional divisions.

Teams 2017–18

Teams 2016-17
Aretians (relegated from Gloucester 2)
Cainscross
Cotham Park
Fairford
Gloucester All Blues
Norton
Tetbury
Wotton

2015–16
The 2015–16 Gloucester 3 consists of seven teams from Gloucestershire. The season starts on 12 September 2015 and is due to end on 16 April 2016.  Four of the seven teams participated in last season's competition. The 2014–15 champions Smiths and runners up Minchinhampton were promoted to the Gloucester 2 while Wotton joined from the Gloucestershire Reserve League.  As it is the basement league in Gloucestershire there is no relegation.

Teams 2014-15
Cainscross
Cheltenham Civil Service (relegated from Gloucester 2)
Gloucester All Blues (relegated from Gloucester 2)
Hardwicke & Quedgeley Harlequins
Minchinhampton
Norton
Smiths 
Tetbury

Teams 2013–14
Cainscross (relegated from Gloucester 2)
Hardwicke & Quedgeley
Minchinhampton
Norton
Old Elizabethans
Smiths 
Tredworth

Teams 2012–13
Gloucester Civil Service
Minchinhampton
Norton	
Old Cryptians (relegated from Gloucester 2)
Old Elizabethans (relegated from Gloucester 2)
Smiths 
Tredworth
Westbury-on-Severn

Teams 2011-12
Bredon Star
Bristol Telephone Area
Cainscross
Gloucester Civil Service
Greyhound RFC (relegated from Gloucester 2)
Minchinhampton
Smiths (relegated from Gloucester 2)

Teams 2010-11
Bristol Telephone Area
Broad Plain
Cainscross (relegated from Gloucester 2)
Gloucester All Blues
Gloucester Civil Service
Minchinhampton
Wotton

Teams 2009-10
Bristol Telephone Area
Dowty
Gloucester All Blues
Gloucester Civil Service
Minchinhampton
Newent
Smiths 
Wotton

Teams 2008-09
Bristol Telephone Area
Cotham Park
Gloucester All Blues
Gloucester Civil Service
Minchinhampton
Newent
St. Brendan's Old Boys
Smiths 
Wotton

Teams 2007-08
Bristol Telephone Area
Cotham Park (relegated from Gloucester 2)
Gloucester All Blues
Gloucester Civil Service
Greyhound
Minchinhampton
Pilning
St. Brendon's Old Boys
Tredworth
Wotton

Teams 2006-07
Bristol Telephone Area
Cainscross
Gloucester All Blues
Gloucester Civil Service
Greyhound
Minchinhampton
Pilning
St. Brendan's Old Boys
Smiths (relegated from Gloucester 2)
Wotton

Teams 2005-06

North
Cainscross
Gloucester All Blues
Gloucester Civil Service
Minchinhampton
Ross-on-Wye
Tredworth
Westbury-on-Severn

South
Bristol Aeroplane Co.
Cotham Park
Kingswood
Pilning
St. Brendan's Old Boys
Tetbury
Wotton

Teams 2004-05

North
Fairford
Gloucester All Blues
Hartpury College
Ross-on-Wye
Smiths 
Tredworth
Westbury-on-Severn

South
Bristol Aeroplane Co.
Bristol Telephone Area
Cainscross
Minchinhampton
Pilning
St. Brendan's Old Boys
Tetbury
Wotton

Teams 2003-04

North
Cainscross
Fairford
Gloucester All Blues
Gloucester Civil Service
Ross-on-Wye
Tredworth
Newent

South
Bristol Aeroplane Co.
Bristol Telephone Area
Cotham Park
Kingswood
Pilning
St. Brendan's Old Boys
Tetbury
Wotton

Teams 2002-03

North
Cainscross
Cheltenham Civil Service
Dursley
Fairford
Gloucester All Blues
Gloucester Civil Service
Newent
Tredworth

South
Bristol Aeroplane Co.
Bristol Telephone Area
Cotham Park
Old Colstonians
Pilning
St. Brendand's Old Boys
Tetbury
Wotton

Teams 2001-02

North
Fairford
Gloucester All Blues
Gloucester Civil Service
Newent
Smiths 
Ross-on-Wye
Tredworth

South
Bristol Aeroplane Co.
Bristol Telephone Area
Cainscross
Cotham Park
Minchinhampton
Tetbury
Wotton

Teams 2000-01

North                           
Fairford
Gloucester All Blues
Gloucester Civil Service
Newent
Ross-on-Wye
Tredworth
Widden Old Boys

South
Bristol Aeroplane Co.
Cotham Park
Minchinhampton
Old Colstonians
St. Brendan's Old Boys
Wotton

Original teams
When league rugby began in 1987 this division (then a single division known as Gloucestershire 3) contained the following teams:

Bishopston
Chipping Sodbury
Chosen Hill Former Pupils
Frampton Cotterell
Gloucester Civil Service
Gloucester Old Boys
Kingswood
Old Bristolians
Painswick
Tewkesbury
Thornbury

Gloucester 3 honours

Gloucestershire 3 (1987–1991)

Originally a single division known as Gloucestershire 3, it was a tier 11 league with promotion to Gloucestershire 2 and relegation to Gloucestershire 4.

Gloucester 3 (1991–1993)

Gloucestershire 3 was shorted to Gloucester 3 for the 1991–92 season onward.  It remained a tier 11 league with promotion to Gloucester 2 and relegation to Gloucester 4.

Gloucester 3 (1993–1996)

The creation of National League 5 South for the 1993–94 season meant that Gloucester 3 dropped to become a tier 12 league.  Promotion continued to Gloucester 2 and relegation to Gloucester 4.

Gloucester 3 (1996–2000)

The cancellation of National League 5 South at the end of the 1995–96 season meant that Gloucester 3 reverted to being a tier 11 league.  Promotion continued to Gloucester 1 while the cancellation of Gloucester 4 meant there was no longer relegation.

Gloucester 3 North / South (2000–2006)

Restructuring of the Gloucester leagues at the end of the 1999–00 season saw Gloucester 3 split into two regional leagues - Gloucester 3 North and Gloucester 3 South - both at tier 11 of the league system.  Promotion continued to Gloucester 2 and there was no relegation.

Gloucester 3 (2006–2009)

For the 2006–07 season Gloucester 3 North and South were remerged back into a single Gloucester 3 division, remaining at tier 11 of the league system.  Promotion continued to Gloucester 2 and there was no relegation.  Between 2007 and 2009 Gloucester 3 was sponsored by High Bridge Jewellers.

Gloucester 3 (2009–2018)

Despite widespread restructuring by the RFU at the end of the 2008–09 season, Gloucester 2 remained a tier 11 league, with promotion continuing to Gloucester 1 and there was no relegation.  From 2017 the league was now sponsored by Wadworth 6x.  At the end of the 2017–18 the division was disbanded and all teams promoted to the newly regionalised Gloucester 2 - Gloucester 2 North or Gloucester 2 South.

Promotion play-offs

Between 2001 and 2005 there was a promotion play-off between the runners-up of Gloucester 3 North and Gloucester 3 South for the third and final promotion place to Gloucester 2. The team with the superior league record had home advantage in the tie.  During the 2005–06 season the play-offs were discontinued as Gloucester 3 would merge into one division for the 2006–07 season.  Before they were discontinued Gloucester 3 North teams have been the most successful with three wins to the Gloucester 3 South teams' two; and the home team has won promotion on all five occasions.

Number of league titles

St Brendan's Old Boys (3) 
Dursley (2)
Gloucester Civil Service (2)
Ross-on-Wye (2) 
Old Elizabethans (2)
Smiths (2)
Bishopston (1)
Bredon Star (1)
Broad Plain (1)
Bristol Aeroplane Co. (1) 
Bristol Telephone Area (1)
Caincross (1)
Cheltenham Civil Service (1) 
Cotham Park (1)
Frampton Cotterell (1)
Gloucester All Blues (1)
Hartpury College (1) 
Hucclecote Old Boys (1)
Kingswood (1)
Minchinhampton (1) 
Newent (1)
Old Bristolians (1)
Old Colstonians (1) 
Old Cryptians (1)
Painswick (1)
Southmead (1)
Tetbury (1) 
Tredworth (1)
United Bristol Hospitals (1)
Widden Old Boys (1)

See also
 Gloucestershire RFU
 English rugby union system
 Rugby union in England

Notes

References

Defunct rugby union leagues in England
Rugby union in Gloucestershire